The Soviet Union men's national under-18 ice hockey team was the men's national under-18 ice hockey team in the Soviet Union. It was succeeded by the Russia men's national under-18 ice hockey team in 1992.

The team won a total of 23 medals at the IIHF European Junior Championships, including 11 gold, seven silver, and five bronze medals. They also won gold at the unofficial 1967 European U19 Championship.

International competitions

IIHF European U18/U19 Championships
 

1967 (unofficial):  1st place
1968:  2nd place
1969:  1st place
1970:  1st place
1971:  1st place
1972:  2nd place
1973:  1st place
1974:  2nd place
1975:  1st place
1976:  1st place
1977:  3rd place
1978:  2nd place
1979:  3rd place

1980:  1st place
1981:  1st place
1982:  3rd place
1983:  1st place
1984:  1st place
1985:  2nd place
1986: 4th place
1987:  3rd place
1988:  3rd place
1989:  1st place
1990:  2nd place
1991:  2nd place

References

National under-18 ice hockey teams
Former national ice hockey teams